A by-election was held in the UK Parliament constituency of Newport West in south Wales on 4 April 2019, following the death of Labour Party MP (Member of Parliament) Paul Flynn. Labour nominated the trade unionist Ruth Jones, who held the seat for the party with 40 percent of the vote and a reduced majority. The Conservative candidate Matthew Evans came second with 31 percent of the vote, followed by Neil Hamilton, the UKIP candidate, on 8%. This was the third parliamentary by-election held during the 57th UK Parliament, which was elected at the 2017 general election.

Background 
In October 2018, the sitting MP Paul Flynn indicated his intention to resign his seat in the imminent future following a worsening of his rheumatoid arthritis. At the time, Flynn indicated that he would wait for a snap general election in case that allowed him to stand down without triggering a by-election, citing the expense involved in organising and holding one. He died on 17 February 2019 following a "long illness".

Newport West has been held by Labour since 1987, when Flynn won the seat from the Conservatives. The constituency is semi-marginal, with Labour majorities not exceeding 10,000 votes except during the electoral landslide of 1997.

The writ of election was moved in Parliament on 28 February, scheduling the by-election for 4 April 2019.

Candidates and timetable
Flynn had indicated his intention to stand down at or before the next general election and political parties had begun to select candidates in Newport West for the next general election, including Jonathan Clark (Plaid Cymru), Matthew Evans (Welsh Conservatives), Ruth Jones (Welsh Labour) and Amelia Womack (Green Party). UKIP selected its Welsh leader Neil Hamilton. The Liberal Democrats selected Ryan Jones. Also standing were Richard Suchorzewski for the Abolish the Welsh Assembly Party; June Davies for the Renew Party; Ian McLean for the continuing SDP; and candidates for For Britain and the Democrats and Veterans.

The new Brexit Party said it would not be standing. The recently formed Independent Group also declined to field its own candidate.

The election was administered by Newport City Council, with the statement of persons nominated published on 8 March 2019.

Campaign
Welsh First Minister Mark Drakeford announced on 12 March that the expected decision on the construction of an M4 relief road around Newport would be delayed due to the purdah rules that had taken effect during the by-election. Such rules prevented the government from making major policy announcements to avoid unduly influencing an election campaign. The news was strongly criticised by the Conservative candidate.

The national backdrop for the by-election was the continued uncertainty over Brexit during the Brexit negotiations in 2019, with the original planned date for leaving the European Union being postponed and the failure of the House of Commons to agree a way forward. The Conservatives were concerned this would adversely affect their vote.

Result

Previous result
Paul Flynn was re-elected to an eighth term of office in the 2017 general election, with an increased majority of 5,658 (13.0%) over the Conservative candidate.

References

By-elections to the Parliament of the United Kingdom in Welsh constituencies
Newport West by-election
Newport West by-election
2010s elections in Wales
Newport West by-election